Scott Diddams is a professor adjoint in the physics department at the University of Colorado Boulder. He is attached to the Optical Frequency Measurements Group at the National Institute of Standards and Technology (NIST) based in Boulder, Colorado. Part of his work there includes research towards increasing the accuracy of the atomic clock.

References

External links

Bethel University tribute to their alumni

21st-century American physicists
People from Boulder, Colorado
Living people
Year of birth missing (living people)
University of Colorado Boulder faculty
Place of birth missing (living people)
Fellows of the American Physical Society